Saint-Rémy-de-Blot (Auvergnat: Sent Remesi de Blòt) is a commune in the Puy-de-Dôme department in Auvergne in central France.

Heritage

Château-Rocher (originally called "Blot-le-Château") is situated on a 150-meter cliff overlooking the Sioule. Its objective was to monitor the Sioule valley and the Menat bridge, a crossroads between Auvergne and Bourbonnais. The fortress was built at the end of the eleventh century at the initiative of Archambaud the Fort, lord of Bourbon. The edification and expansion of the castle continued until the fifteenth century, but it seems to have lost its strategic importance from the sixteenth century onwards. It would have been abandoned in the course of the eighteenth century. Today the castle is in ruins, but since 1964, the Château-Rocher Association has undertaken consolidation9. Access to the site is free for part of the year. In July and August, the Château-Rocher Association offers guided tours.

References

Saintremydeblot